Trude Marlen (born Trude Posch; 1912–2005) was an Austrian stage and film actress. She was the second wife of Wolf Albach-Retty, and moved to Germany to live with him during the Nazi era where she was well-connected with the Nazi leadership. She appeared in lead roles in several German films of the 1930s such as Bachelor's Paradise (1939) although she remained primarily a theatre actress. She later relocated to Vienna and appeared in a number of Austrian films during the post-Second World War years such as Who Kisses Whom? (1947).

Selected filmography
 Love Conquers All (1934)
 Playing with Fire (1934)
 Marriage Strike (1935)
 Romance (1936)
 A Hoax (1936)
 The Empress's Favourite (1936)
 The Grey Lady (1937)
 Bachelor's Paradise (1939)
 I Am Sebastian Ott (1939)
 Operetta (1940)
 Who Kisses Whom? (1947)
 Adventure in Vienna (1952)

References

Bibliography 
 Fritsche, Maria. Homemade Men In Postwar Austrian Cinema: Nationhood, Genre and Masculinity . Berghahn Books, 2013.

External links 
 

1912 births
2005 deaths
Austrian stage actresses
Austrian film actresses
Actors from Graz